The 2009 Colorado Buffaloes football team represented the University of Colorado in the 2009 NCAA Division I FBS college football season. The Buffaloes were led by fourth-year head coach Dan Hawkins and played their home games at Folsom Field. The Buffaloes finished the season with a record of 3–9 and 2–6 in Big 12 play.

Schedule

References

Colorado
Colorado Buffaloes football seasons
Colorado Buffaloes football